Pericei is a commune located in Sălaj County, Crișana, Romania. It is composed of four villages: Bădăcin (Szilágybadacsony), Pericei, Periceiu Mic (Kisperecsentanya), and Sici (Somlyószécs).

Geography
Pericei lies on the banks of the river Crasna.

Sights
 Orthodox Church in Bădăcin, built in the 18th century (1705), historic monument
 Reformed Church, Pericei, completed in 1769
 Iuliu Maniu native house in Bădăcin, built in the 19th century (1890), historic monument
 Orthodox church in Sici, built 1808. In the 17th-18th centuries the inhabitants of Sici were Calvinist Hungarians with a Protestant church. After political boundary changes, the inhabitants were Orthodox Romanians.

Politics

2012 election
The Pericei Council, elected in the 2012 local government elections, is made up of 21 councilors, with the following party composition: 9-Democratic Union of Hungarians in Romania, 3-Democratic Liberal Party, 1-Hungarian Civic Party. Mayor Csaba Boncidai was re-elected.

2008 elections
Mayor Csaba Boncidai was re-elected.

2004 elections
Csaba Boncidai was elected mayor of the commune.

Natives
Virgil Ardelean
Victor Deleu
Iuliu Maniu

References

Communes in Sălaj County
Localities in Crișana